Olne is a municipality of Wallonia located in the province of Liège, Belgium. 

On January 1, 2006, Olne had a total population of 3,793. The total area is 15.99 km² which gives a population density of 237 inhabitants per km².

Olne was the 24th village to join Les Plus Beaux Villages de Wallonie.

See also
 List of protected heritage sites in Olne

References

External links
 
  Official website

 
Municipalities of Liège Province